Kat Sandler is a Canadian actress, playwright, and theatre director.

Sandler is perhaps best known for her play Mustard, for which she was awarded the Dora Mavor Moore Award for Outstanding New Play in 2016. She currently serves as Artistic Director of Theatre Brouhaha in Toronto.

Plays

Earth-Bound Angel
Lovesexmoney
Help Yourself
We Are the Bomb
Delicacy
Will
Cockfight 
Punch-Up
Retreat
Liver
Late Night
Bright Lights
Mustard
Sucker
Bang Bang
The End of the World Club
Yaga

References

21st-century Canadian dramatists and playwrights
Canadian women dramatists and playwrights
Canadian stage actresses
Actresses from Toronto
Writers from Toronto
Living people
Year of birth missing (living people)
21st-century Canadian women writers